Hypericum tubulosum, the lesser marsh St. Johnswort or southern marsh St. John's-wort, is a species of flowering plant in the family Hypericaceae. Formerly classified as synonym Triadenum tubulosum, the species is found across the Southern United States and Midwest. It grows in wetlands such as bogs and floodplains.

Description
Its pink flowers bloom in August and September.

References

tubulosum